Arthur De Greef was the defending champion but lost in the third round to Tomáš Macháč.

Kamil Majchrzak won the title after defeating Jannik Sinner 6–1, 6–0 in the final.

Seeds
All seeds receive a bye into the second round.

Draw

Finals

Top half

Section 1

Section 2

Bottom half

Section 3

Section 4

References

External links
Main draw
Qualifying draw

Prosperita Open - Singles
2019 Singles